Wonders is the fifth studio album by American musical group The Piano Guys. It was released on October 7, 2014 by Portrait Records. The album reached number 12 on the US Billboard 200, making it their highest charting album to date.

The album also features the beginning of their "Wonders of the World" quest, beginning at the Great Wall of China for their video "Kung Fu Piano: Cello Ascends" and the "Christ the Redeemer" statue in Rio for their video "The Mission/ How Great Thou Art".

Track listing

Notes

Personnel
Per liner notes
The Piano Guys
Steven Sharp Nelson – cello, percussion, additional piano and vocals
Jon Schmidt – piano, additional percussion and vocals
Al van der Beek – percussion, vocals, additional piano

Additional musicians
Shweta Subram – lead vocals on "Don't You Worry Child"
Jake Bowen – percussion on "Summer Jam"
Gigi Romney – additional percussion on "Kung Fu Piano: Cello Ascends"

Charts

Weekly charts

Year-end charts

References 

2014 classical albums
Sony Music albums
The Piano Guys albums